Jack H. Freed (born April 19, 1938) is an American chemist known for his pioneering work in electron paramagnetic resonance (aka electron spin resonance) spectroscopy. He is the Frank and Robert Laughlin Professor of Physical Chemistry, Emeritus, at Cornell University in Ithaca, New York.

Biography
Jack Freed was born in New York City. He received his bachelor's degree in chemical engineering in 1958 from Yale University and his Ph.D. in chemistry in 1962 from Columbia University.

Freed is currently the Frank and Robert Laughlin Professor of Physical Chemistry, Emeritus, in the Department of Chemistry and Chemical Biology at Cornell University. In 2001, Freed founded the National Biomedical Center for Advanced Electron Spin Resonance Technology (ACERT) funded by National Institutes of Health and has been its Director since then. In 2004, he was an editor for Journal of Physical Chemistry. Before that he was a fellow in numerous places such as Alfred P. Sloan Research Foundation, American Academy of Arts and Sciences, American Physical Society, John Simon Guggenheim Memorial Foundation, Hebrew University Institute for Advanced Studies, and Weizmann Institute of Science.

Honors and awards 
 Fellow of the A. P. Sloan Foundation, 1966
 Senior Fellow of the Weizmann Institute of Science, 1970
 Fellow of the American Physical Society, 1976
 Buck-Whitney Award in Pure and Applied Chemistry by American Chemical Society, 1981
 Bruker Award in Electron Spin Resonance by the Royal Society of Chemistry, 1990 
 Fellow of the American Academy of Arts and Sciences, 1994
 Gold Medal by International EPR/ESR Society, 1994
 Irving Langmuir Prize in Chemical Physics by the American Physical Society, 1997
 International Zavoisky Award by the Russian Academy of Sciences, 1998
 Honorary member of the National Magnetic Society of India, 2001
 Special J.H. Freed Festschrift Issue by the Journal of Physical Chemistry on his 65th birthday, 2004 
 Fellow of the International Society of Magnetic Resonance, 2008
 E. Bright Wilson Award in Spectroscopy by the American Chemical Society, 2008
 Fellow of the Royal Society of Chemistry, 2009
 Fellow of the American Association for the Advancement of Science, 2009
 ISMAR Prize by the International Society of Magnetic Resonance, 2013
 Joel Henry Hildebrand Award in the Chemistry of Liquids by the American Chemical Society, 2014 
 Fellow of the International EPR/ESR Society, 2017

References

External links
Publications and Patents of Jack H. Freed

1938 births
Living people
Scientists from New York City
21st-century American physicists
Columbia Graduate School of Arts and Sciences alumni
Yale School of Engineering & Applied Science alumni
Fellows of the American Physical Society